Kay Hammond (December 14, 1901 – January 7, 1982) was an American actress. She was born in Kansas City, Kansas. She acted only in Hollywood productions. There has generally been some confusion to which of the two actresses was in the film Abraham Lincoln as some reference books designate an English actress of the same name. It is, however, widely accepted throughout filmography that it was the American actress.

Filmography

External links
 
 

American film actresses
1901 births
1982 deaths
Burials at Forest Lawn Memorial Park (Glendale)
20th-century American actresses